Hōkongō-in (法金剛院) is a Buddhist temple in Ukyō-ku, Kyoto, Japan. It is affiliated with Risshū (Buddhism). It was founded in 1130.

See also 
Thirteen Buddhist Sites of Kyoto
List of National Treasures of Japan (sculptures)

Buddhist temples in Kyoto Prefecture